Marie Benoît (born 16 March 1995) is a Belgian professional tennis player.

Benoît has won ten singles titles and ten doubles titles on the ITF Circuit. On 21 September 2020, she achieved her best singles ranking of world No. 228. On 18 October 2021, she peaked at No. 208 in the WTA doubles rankings.

Playing for the Belgium Fed Cup team, Benoît has a win–loss record of 1–0.

Career highlights
Benoît's singles debut on the WTA Tour came at the 2019 Internationaux de Strasbourg, where she was defeated in the first round by Ukrainian player Marta Kostyuk. In doubles, she made her debut at the 2019 Bucharest Open, when she lost with her partner Ysaline Bonaventure in the first round.

In 2020, she reached final of a WTA Challenger doubles event, partnering with Jessika Ponchet. The following year was marked by participating in all four Grand Slam qualifying tournaments, twice reaching the second round.

Grand Slam singles performance timeline

WTA 125 finals

Doubles: 1 (runner-up)

ITF Circuit finals

Singles: 21 (11 titles, 10 runner–ups)

Doubles: 24 (10 titles, 14 runner–ups)

Notes

References

External links
 
 
 

1995 births
Living people
Belgian female tennis players
People from Eupen
Sportspeople from Liège Province
21st-century Belgian women